Anchovy railway station opened in c1894 and closed in 1992.

It was built  around 1894 of timber in the Jamaican Georgian architectural style. It has two floors.  The ground floor has timber doors and sash windows. The upper floor is partially cantilevered and is supported by a series of timber posts on the ground floor to form a canopy over the platform and front elevation. The upper floor has a mixture of sash and louvred windows as well as recessed panel timber doors. The roof of the structure is a T-shaped gable end zinc roof with a semi-circular fanlight on either side of a double gable end section of the roof.

In 2003 it was reported as being in "very poor condition" and "in need of major repairs".

It is on the list of designated National Heritage Sites in Jamaica.

Fares
In 1910 the third class fare from Anchovy to Kingston was 8/- (eight shillings); first class was about double.

See also
Railway stations in Jamaica

References

Railway stations in Jamaica
Buildings and structures in Saint James Parish, Jamaica
Railway stations opened in 1894
Railway stations closed in 1992